Guido Cerniglia (February 3, 1939 – May 14, 2020) was an Italian actor.

References

1939 births
2020 deaths
20th-century Italian male actors
21st-century Italian male actors
Italian male voice actors